Jet Set (also known as The National Lottery: Jet Set) is a BBC National Lottery game show which was broadcast on BBC One from 20 January 2001 to 8 August 2007. It was hosted by Eamonn Holmes.

Format
Six studio contestants compete against one another for a chance to face off against the previous week's champion, with a week's luxury holiday for two at stake.

Round One: In the Red
Each contestant in turn is given a category and must decide whether to play it or pass to an opponent. A question is then asked; a contestant who answers incorrectly, or who passes to an opponent who answers correctly, is put "in the red." Only one contestant can be in the red at any given time; this contestant is skipped in the order of play, but can have questions passed to them.

This round is played four times, lasting approximately 60 seconds per playing. When time runs out, the contestant in the red is eliminated from play. Any question that is started when time runs out is then finished and can be answered.

Round Two: Play or Pass
Each of the two remaining contestants in turn is given a category and may either play it or pass to the opponent. A correct answer scores one point, while a miss awards the point to the opponent. The first contestant to score four points advances to the final, after which two more lottery draws are held.

In series 1, a buzzer question about the location visited by the previous week's winner was asked to determine initial control. From series 2, the contestant who had been in the red fewer times during round 1 had control. If the contestants were tied in this respect, control went to the one who had given more correct answers.

Round Three: The Final
Both the remaining studio contestant and the previous week's champion (playing via satellite from their latest vacation site) don blindfolds and headphones, so that they cannot see or hear the numbers drawn in the Lotto draw. They are then shown the first number, and the studio contestant must guess whether the next number was higher or lower. A correct guess allows them to select a category from a list of six, while a miss allows the champion to select instead. The studio contestant is then asked a question in that category, scoring one point for a correct answer or awarding one to the champion for a miss.

Control alternates between the two participants, with the one in control making the high/low guess based on the last revealed number and then answering a question. The first to score three points wins the holiday and takes/keeps the championship. If the studio contestant loses in this round, they are invited back to compete again on the following week's episode.

Jet Set 2012
Jet Set returned to BBC One on 20 June 2007 under the new name of Jet Set 2012, with all the destinations being previous Olympic venues (since London would be hosting the 2012 Summer Olympics). This was announced by Eamonn Holmes on the Midweek Draws with Scott Mills on 16 May 2007. It was filmed at BBC Scotland's Queen Margaret Drive studio in Glasgow, and saw the show move to Wednesday nights in the process. Each episode featured the National Lottery Dream Number taking place live from Lottery HQ, and its results formed part of the end game where the contestants made the high, low or same number guesses to gain control of choosing a subject. The Thunderball and Lotto draws took place in a separate live broadcast later in the evening during this series.

Notable incidents
On 20 May 2006, the programme was invaded by protestors from the campaign group Fathers 4 Justice, moments before the Lotto draw was due to take place. This resulted in the programme being forced off-air for several minutes, whilst the protestors were removed from the studio by security. With that night's Eurovision Song Contest just minutes away from starting, the programme quickly rushed through both the Lotto and Lotto Extra draws to avoid being cut off.

Transmissions

References

External links

2001 British television series debuts
2007 British television series endings
2000s British game shows
BBC television game shows
BBC Scotland television shows
British game shows about lotteries
Television series by BBC Studios